Sato Co., Ltd. is headquartered in Fukuchiyama city, Kyoto Prefecture, and is mainly a shopping center and supermarket business.

Main business is the retailing (supermarket), other activities include:
 family restaurants "Fuji No Nori", "Flower Fuji", "And Fuji"
 restaurant management
 "STOCK" and "STOCK hall" home centers
 clothing specialty shops "Rosa Plus" and "La Fonte"
Services include traveling, home delivery and insurance substitution services. In 2001 Rakuten opened an online shop dedicated to giftware items "Sato Airobu" and a wide range of retailing sectors. Company also develops stores.

Sato is a member of the Nichiri Group .

See also 
List of oldest companies

References 
Article contains translated text from さとう (京都府) on Japanese Wikipedia retrieved on 25 February 2017.

External links 
Homepage

Retail companies established in 1666
Supermarkets of Japan
Companies based in Kyoto Prefecture
Companies established in the 17th century
17th-century establishments in Japan